This is a list of notable students and faculty of Shimer College, a Great Books college that was acquired in 2017 by North Central College.

Founded in 1853, Shimer occupied a traditional college campus in Mount Carroll, Illinois, from 1853 to 1978, and an improvised campus in Waukegan from 1979 to 2006.  It then occupied a dedicated space on the Illinois Institute of Technology campus in Chicago since 2006. Small throughout its existence, Shimer enrolled 141 students as of 2012. As of 2008, Shimer had 5,615 living alumni.  On June 1, 2017 the College became the Shimer Great Books School of North Central College.

The school was known for its Great Books curriculum, and also for its early entrance program, both of which have been in effect since 1950.  Many on this list were early entrants.

A

B

C

D

E

F

G

H

J

K

L

M

N

O

P

R

S

V

W

Y

Works cited

References

People
Shimer College people